Shelby White (born 1938) is an American investor, art collector, and philanthropist. She serves on the board of the Metropolitan Museum of Art and is a founding trustee of the Leon Levy Foundation.

Early life 
White was born in 1938 and grew up in Brooklyn, NY. She received a bachelor's degree from Mount Holyoke College and a master's from Columbia University. After college, White married investment banker Rodney L. White, who died in 1969.

In the 1970s, White married Leon Levy, an American investor and philanthropist, and she and her husband developed an interest in antiquities and started bidding at New York auctions in 1975.

Career 
Over the next several decades, White and Levy accumulated a substantial collection of objects from different time periods and international origins. Many of the pieces in their collection are on display at the Metropolitan Museum of Art.

In the early 1990s, White and Levy gave 16 artifacts to the British Museum after being threatened with a lawsuit. In 2008, White returned 9 pieces that the Italian government suggested had been exported questionably.

In 1995, White and her husband made a donation of $20 million for the renovation and expansion of the Met's Greek and Roman Galleries. White has also served on the board of the American Schools of Oriental Research, an archeological organization with institutes in Cyprus, Jordan and Israel.

White was also a financial journalist and wrote for publications including The New York Times. In 1992, White published the book What Every Woman Should Know About Her Husband’s Money.

In 2000, White was appointed to the Cultural Property Advisory Committee, a government organization formed in 1983 to help combat illicit international trade of antiquities.

After her husband's death in 2003, White established the Leon Levy Foundation. Through this organization, White has funded her philanthropic efforts including a $25 million donation to New York City parks in 2008, $200 million to NYU for an ancient studies institute, and $3.25 million for an addition to the Brooklyn Public Library in 2010.

In 2017, White received the Carnegie Medal of Philanthropy, a private philanthropic award established in 2001.

References 

Philanthropists from New York (state)
20th-century American philanthropists
1938 births
Living people
Giving Pledgers
21st-century philanthropists
Mount Holyoke College alumni